Gabriel Appelt Pires (born 18 September 1993), sometimes known as just Gabriel, is a Brazilian professional footballer who plays for Botafogo, on loan from Portuguese club Benfica, as a midfielder.

Club career

Resende
Born in Rio de Janeiro, Gabriel Pires and his older brother Guilherme started each of their careers at Resende Futebol Clube; Gabriel signed his first contract on 23 July 2010. He played his first senior season with the club during the 2011 Campeonato Carioca, the regional league in the state of Rio.

Juventus and loans
In April 2011, Italian newspaper, Tuttosport reported that Juventus Football Club signed both Gabriel and Guilherme, however due to bureatic reasons, Gabriel couldn't move to Italy until after his 18th birthday. In January 2012 Gabriel officially signed with the Italian club for a fee of €2 million, though the deal had virtually been complete since 21 April 2011. After joining the Italian side, Gabriel joined the club's youth academy and played the remaining half-season for Juventus' reserve during the 2011–12 season.

On 30 August 2012, Gabriel Pires was sent on a season-long loan deal to Serie B newcomer Pro Vercelli, another Piedmont-based team, along with Juventus teammate, Alberto Masi. Gabriel made his Serie B debut on 9 September 2012 as a 61st-minute substitute in a 1–2 home loss against Livorno. He made his first start on 15 September against Sassuolo and went on to start the next ten league matches prior to suffering a major injury on 10 November 2012 in a home match against Modena. After four months on the sidelines, Gabriel returned to Pro Vercelli's starting lineup on 2 March 2013 in a 1–1 away draw at Juve Stabia. He remained in the club's starting lineup for the remainder of the campaign, making 25 league appearances and scoring 1 league goal.

Gabriel Pires returned to Juventus on 30 June 2013 and two months later, he was sent out on another season-long loan deal to Serie B side Spezia on 26 August 2013. He made 19 league appearances for the club.

On 23 July 2014, Appelt signed with Serie B side Pescara on a season-long loan deal along with teammate Vincenzo Fiorillo. He appeared in 17 matches for the club, scoring once.

Leganés
On 4 August 2015, Gabriel Pires was loaned to Spanish Segunda División side CD Leganés, in a season-long deal. He made his debut for the club on 6 September, coming on as a late substitute for Lluís Sastre in a 1–1 home draw against Real Zaragoza.

Gabriel Pires scored his first goal for Lega on 17 October 2015, netting his team's second in a 2–2 draw against Girona FC. He contributed with 37 appearances and seven goals during the campaign, as his side achieved promotion to La Liga for the first time ever.

On 17 June 2016, Gabriel Pires signed a permanent three-year deal with the Madrid side, who activated his buyout clause for €1 million fee. He made his debut in the main category of Spanish football on 22 August 2016, starting in a 1–0 away win against Celta de Vigo.

Gabriel Pires scored his first goal in the top tier on 17 September 2016, but in a 1–5 home loss against FC Barcelona. The following 8 August, he renewed his contract until 2021.

Benfica
On 27 August 2018, Gabriel Pires was transferred to Portuguese side S.L. Benfica, signing a five-year contract.

Honours
Benfica
 Primeira Liga: 2018–19
Supertaça Cândido de Oliveira: 2019

References

External links

1993 births
Living people
Brazilian footballers
Association football midfielders
Resende Futebol Clube players
Serie B players
Juventus F.C. players
F.C. Pro Vercelli 1892 players
Spezia Calcio players
Delfino Pescara 1936 players
U.S. Livorno 1915 players
La Liga players
Segunda División players
CD Leganés players
Primeira Liga players
S.L. Benfica footballers
Qatar Stars League players
Al-Gharafa SC players
Campeonato Brasileiro Série A players
Botafogo de Futebol e Regatas players
Brazilian expatriate footballers
Expatriate footballers in Italy
Brazilian expatriate sportspeople in Italy
Expatriate footballers in Spain
Brazilian expatriate sportspeople in Spain
Expatriate footballers in Portugal
Brazilian expatriate sportspeople in Portugal
Expatriate footballers in Qatar
Brazilian expatriate sportspeople in Qatar
Naturalised citizens of Portugal
Footballers from Rio de Janeiro (city)